Singpho may refer to:
Singpho people, also known as the Jingpo people
Singpho dialect, a dialect of the Jingpho language

Language and nationality disambiguation pages